Qaleh Now-ye Fariman (also Romanized as Qal‘eh Now-ye Farīmān, Qal‘eh Now-e Farīmān, Qal’eh Now-Ye-Farīmān, and Qal‘eh-ye Now-ye Farīmān) is a village in Fariman Rural District, in the Central District of Fariman County, Razavi Khorasan Province, Iran. At the 2006 census, its population was 3,310, in 772 families.

References 

Populated places in Fariman County